The Casotti Madonna or Madonna and Child with Saint Paul, Saint Agnes and Donors is an oil on panel painting by Andrea Previtali now in the Accademia Carrara in Bergamo, commissioned in 1523 by Paolo Casotti, a rich merchant from Bergamo, the artist's native city

References

Bibliography
 
  Gianmario Petrò, 'La casa di Paolo de Mazzoleni al n. 70 di via Pignolo ora Palazzo Albani Bonomi', inLa Rivista di Bergamo via the Gazzetta di Bergamo, 1992.

Paintings by Andrea Previtali
Collections of the Accademia Carrara
Paintings of the Madonna and Child
Paintings of Agnes of Rome
Paintings depicting Paul the Apostle
1523 paintings